Georg Winter may refer to:

 Georg Winter (manager) (born 1941), German businessman and environmentalist
 Georg Winter (historian) (1856–1912), German historian and archivist
 Heinrich Georg Winter (1848–1887), German mycologist